Denise is a station on the Overbrook branch of the Port Authority of Allegheny County's light rail network. It is located in the Carrick neighborhood of Pittsburgh, Pennsylvania. The station features no parking or connecting bus routes but instead serves a (somewhat blighted) commercial corridor along Saw Mill Run Blvd and a slopeside residential area which extends from the west side of the station.

History
Denise was opened in 2004, one of eight new platform equipped stations which replaced 33 streetcar style stops along the Overbrook branch.

Bus connections
51 Carrick

References

External links

Port Authority T Station listings
Denise Street entrance from Google Maps Street View

Port Authority of Allegheny County stations
Railway stations in the United States opened in 2004
Blue Line (Pittsburgh)
Silver Line (Pittsburgh)